Raymond Gerard Trowbridge (August 27, 1896 – October 3, 1962) was a professional football player.  He played in the American Professional Football Association (AFPA)—which became the National Football League (NFL) in 1922—with the  Cleveland Tigers and the New York Brickley Giants. Brickley's New York Giants are not related to the modern-day New York Giants.

He played football for Everett High School in Everett, Massachusetts. He was a part of the 1914 Everett team that went 13–0 and outscored opponents 600 to 0. Prior to joining the NFL, Ray played college football at Boston College and Purdue University.

References

External links
       

1896 births
1962 deaths
American football ends
Boston College Eagles football players
Cleveland Tigers (NFL) players
New York Brickley Giants players
Purdue Boilermakers football players
Sportspeople from Everett, Massachusetts
Players of American football from South Bend, Indiana